Arthur Bialas (21 November 1930 – 12 November 2012) was a German footballer.

He scored 79 goals in the East German top division for SC Empor Rostock.

Arthur Bialas won his only cap in a World Cup qualifier against Hungary in 1961.

External links
 
 
 
 
 List of DDR internationals
 Arthur Bialas' obituary

References 

1930 births
2012 deaths
German footballers
East German footballers
East Germany international footballers
FC Hansa Rostock players
Eisenhüttenstädter FC Stahl players
DDR-Oberliga players
Association football forwards